Olga Kononenko (born 1991 in Chelyabinsk) was second vice-miss to the Miss Russia 2010.

Biography 

Kononenko lives in the Leninsky district of Chelyabinsk and studied at the Lyceum No. 37. In the modeling business, came quite by accident. At one of the exhibitions, where she came with her parents, was a model agency scout. She offered to try casting. Kononenko was then 12 years.

Path Olga Kononenko to this prestigious competition was not easy. Pupil model agency Models participated in the contest "Miss Chelyabinsk 2007, won the second place and received the maximum number of nominations. But then at the federal competition it is not sent. In late 2009 a girl was lucky: during a visit to Chelyabinsk regional director of the Miss Russia "Marat Kudusov noticed her and offered to try their hand at 2010-m.

By tradition, the Russian competition from the city of Chelyabinsk had to go to the winner of the contest "Miss Chelyabinsk. Last year, the crown went to a pretty Julia Safarova, however, in Moscow, she never went. Looking at the portfolio of beauty, capital organizers asked Julia to find a replacement. Now the competition the emphasis is on the model's appearance and proportions of figures, but Safarova distracting from this format. The organizers themselves have proposed the candidature of Olga Kononenko - girls, which in 2007 was in Chelyabinsk Vice-Miss. Even then she was very pleased the jury, but was too young to defile on the podium "Miss Russia" - Ole just turned 16. And two years later she was lucky. She became the second vice-miss to the Miss Russia 2010.

Kononenko is now studying at the Chelyabinsk City University and plans to continue her modeling career.

Titles Olga Kononenko 

Vice-Miss Chelyabinsk

2 Vice-Miss at competition Miss Russia 2010

References 

Russian beauty pageant winners
People from Chelyabinsk
1991 births
Living people